Roberto Galbiati (born 16 September 1957 in Cernusco sul Naviglio) is an Italian professional football coach and a former player, who played as a defender.

1957 births
Living people
People from Cernusco sul Naviglio
Italian footballers
Italy under-21 international footballers
Serie A players
Serie B players
Inter Milan players
Delfino Pescara 1936 players
ACF Fiorentina players
Torino F.C. players
S.S. Lazio players
A.C. Prato players
Spezia Calcio players
Italian football managers
Association football defenders
Footballers from Lombardy
Sportspeople from the Metropolitan City of Milan